Joel Allen Vaughn (born June 15, 1986) is an American Christian musician, who plays a Christian pop, Christian EDM, and Christian rock style of contemporary worship music. He has released three studio albums, Don't Give Up (2010), In the Waiting (2014), and Kinetic (2016), while he has released two extended plays, Bigger Than Me (2009) and Joel Vaughn (2015).

Early and personal life
Joel Allen Vaughn was born on June 15, 1986. He graduated from West Texas A&M University, with his baccalaureate. He is a worship leader. Vaughn married Andra Leigh Helms in 2006.

Music career
Vaughn's music recording career started in 2005, with his first extended play, Bigger Than Me, releasing in 2009. His subsequent next two releases were studio albums, Don't Give Up in 2010, and In the Waiting in 2014. While his second extended play, Joel Vaughn, got him some media coverage and the attention of Dream Records in 2015. He released, Kinetic, a studio album, on April 22, 2016.

Discography
Studio albums
Don't Give Up (2010)
In the Waiting (2014)
Control (2018)

EPs
Bigger Than Me (2009)
Joel Vaughn (2015)
Kinetic (2016)
Surrender (2017)

Touring band
Though a solo artist himself, Joel Vaughn occasionally travels with a touring band.

Current
 Joey Vaughn – guitar (2010–present)
Michael McDowell – bass (2016–present)
Garrett Hawkins – drums (2018–present)

Former
 Ryan Richardson – drums (2011–2014)

Guest appearances

References

External links
 
 

1986 births
Living people
American performers of Christian music
Musicians from Texas
Songwriters from Texas
West Texas A&M University alumni